Mir-Sayid Bakhrom Mausoleum is a 10th-11th century mausoleum in the city of Karmana near Navoiy, Uzbekistan. Mir-Sayid Bakhrom has features similar to the Samanid Mausoleum in Bukhara, Arab-Ata Mausoleum in the Samarkand Region, and to the mausoleum of Oq Ostona Bobo in the Surxondaryo Region.

World Heritage status 

This site was added to the UNESCO World Heritage Tentative List on January 18, 2008, in the Cultural category.

References

Mausoleums in Uzbekistan
World Heritage Tentative List